Jane Margaret Triche Milazzo (born March 2, 1957) is a United States district judge of the United States District Court for the Eastern District of Louisiana.

Early life and education 

A native of Napoleonville, Louisiana, Milazzo earned a Bachelor of Arts degree in 1977 from Nicholls State University. She then earned a Juris Doctor in 1992 from Louisiana State University's Paul M. Hebert Law Center.

Professional career 

Milazzo began her career as an elementary school teacher. She then began working in 1986 as a paralegal for a Napoleonville, Louisiana law firm. In 1989, she shifted to being a law clerk while attending law school. From 1992 until 1998, she served as an associate at her family's law firm, and from 1998 until 2008, she was a partner in that firm. In 2008, Milazzo was elected a state district judge in Louisiana.

Federal judicial service 

On March 16, 2011, President Obama nominated Milazzo to fill a seat on the United States District Court for the Eastern District of Louisiana that had been vacated by Judge Mary Ann Vial Lemmon, who took senior status in January 2011. On October 11, 2011, the United States Senate voted to confirm Milazzo in a 98–0 vote. She received her judicial commission the following day. Milazzo was appointed to the bench under the name Jane Margaret Triche-Milazzo, but has since changed her name to Jane Margaret Triche Milazzo.

Personal life

Milazzo is the daughter of former Louisiana politician Risley C. Triche and Clara Triche of Napoleonville, Louisiana. She is married to John W. Milazzo Jr. and they have four children.

References

External links
 
 

1957 births
Living people
Judges of the United States District Court for the Eastern District of Louisiana
Louisiana state court judges
Louisiana State University alumni
Nicholls State University alumni
People from Napoleonville, Louisiana
United States district court judges appointed by Barack Obama
21st-century American judges
Louisiana Democrats
21st-century American women judges